The Games Of The XXVII Olympiad 2000: Music from the Opening Ceremony is a compilation album of music from the 2000 Summer Olympics opening ceremony, released in 2000.

Theme
The program celebrated a wide collection of exclusively Australian artists and composers from many different backgrounds. There was a focus on contemporary classical composers, such as Elena Kats-Chernin and Chong Lim, film composers such as Bruce Rowland and David Hirschfelder, Jazz artists such as James Morrison, Indigenous songlines arranged by David Page, House music from Peewee Ferris and pop from John Foreman, Paul Begaud, John Gillard, Trevor White, Vanessa Corish & Wayne Tester. The opening piece to the artistic section, Deep Sea Dreaming, is still regularly performed by Kats-Chernin and by treble choirs in Australia.

The Sydney Symphony Orchestra was the orchestra at the ceremony and performed most of the works in the program, although some pieces performed by the Melbourne Symphony Orchestra was noted in the program and CD. It came to light in August 2008 that the Sydney Symphony mimed its performance during the opening ceremony to tracks prerecorded by both orchestras, after an incident at the 2008 Opening Ceremony revealed that a girl lip-synched a song and used another girl's voice. Morrison's Fanfare performance was also mimed on the night. All performances were recorded in either the Sydney Opera House Concert Hall or Studios 301 in Sydney. All voice artists performed live.

The Australian bush song "Waltzing Matilda" became a musical motif as performed as a sing-a-long during the Prelude, quoted in Morrison's Fanfare and performed by the Sydney 2000 Band.

The Flame was released as a single two weeks before the performance.

Release
The soundtrack The Games of the XXVII Olympiad: Official Music from the Opening Ceremony was released on 18 September. The music album peaked at number 1 on the ARIA Charts and was certified 2× platinum in Australia. It was nominated at the 2001 ARIA Awards for Best Original Soundtrack Album.

Music which was not on the official soundtrack included a remix of Eternity by Peewee Ferris which was played at the end of the Artistic section, the Marching Band arrangements of Olympic themes by Ken Dye, and an excerpt from the orchestral work The Warriors: Music to an Imaginary Ballet by Percy Grainger, which was played during the rising of the cauldron.

Track listing

Charts

Certifications

References

2000 compilation albums
Olympic albums
2000 Summer Olympics